A number of steamships were named Merida, including

, an American passenger cargo ship in service 1906–1911 with Ward Line which sank in collision with steamer Admiral Farragut 
, an American cargo ship in service 1911–1937 with Red D Line
, a British cargo ship wrecked off Le Touquet

Ship names